New Hampshire Route 1A is an  long state highway located in southeast New Hampshire. The route runs along the Atlantic coastline from the Massachusetts border north to Rye, then turns toward downtown Portsmouth. The southern terminus is at the Massachusetts state line in Seabrook where it continues south as Massachusetts Route 1A. The northern terminus is at a junction with U.S. Route 1 in downtown Portsmouth. For the length of the road's run along the shore, its local name is Ocean Boulevard.  In the northern part of Rye, it is known as Pioneer Road, and in Portsmouth, it is known as Miller Avenue and Sagamore Avenue.

Route description

NH 1A begins at the state border between Seabrook and Salisbury, Massachusetts.  Just  from the state line, NH 1A meets the eastern end of NH 286, an extension of Massachusetts Route 286, a connector to US 1 and Interstate 95 in Salisbury. NH 1A proceeds north, passing east of Hampton Harbor into Hampton Beach.  It is on Hampton Beach where NH 101 meets its eastern end at NH 1A as a single-lane alleyway in each direction (Church Street northbound, Highland Avenue southbound).  NH 1A continues as a four-lane divided highway running directly next to the coastline beaches.  Just north of an intersection with Winnacunnet Road, NH 1A narrows back to a two-lane undivided highway, and then meets the eastern end of NH 27.  The road continues another mile or so, crossing into North Hampton, and meets the eastern end of NH 111.  NH 1A proceeds north out of North Hampton and along the coastline past Rye Beach, Rye North Beach, Wallis Sands, and Odiorne Point State Park, where it turns west, away from the ocean.  The road turns back north at the intersection known as Foyes Corner and enters the Portsmouth city limits, passing the southern end of NH 1B (a connector to New Castle). NH 1A continues towards downtown Portsmouth, where it ends at the intersection of Miller Avenue and Middle Street (US 1).

Major intersections

Road names along route

NH 1A is known by the following local street names:

Seabrook
Ocean Boulevard

Hampton
Ocean Boulevard
Ashworth Avenue (southbound)

North Hampton
Ocean Boulevard

Rye
Ocean Boulevard
Pioneer Road
Sagamore Avenue

Portsmouth
Sagamore Avenue
Miller Avenue

References

Further reading

External links

001A
Transportation in Rockingham County, New Hampshire
U.S. Route 1